Edgewater High School is a public secondary school located in the College Park section of Orlando, Florida. It is operated by the Orange County Public Schools system. The athletic teams are known as the 'Fighting Eagles' with colors red and white.

History

In 1950, the School Board of Orange County, Florida unveiled plans to build two new high schools in Orlando. These two schools were built from the same architectural plans and both were opened on the same day, Tuesday, September 2, 1952. The first was named William R. Boone High School and the second was named Edgewater High School. Boone was named for William R. Boone, a long-serving principal of the original Orlando High School (which is now Howard Middle School, on Robinson Street in downtown Orlando, near Lake Eola). The campuses of Boone and Edgewater contained identical buildings, but their arrangement on each campus was different. Edgewater's first principal was Mr. Orville R. Davis, a veteran of Orange County Public Schools, who was once the principal of the original Memorial Junior High School (now Memorial Middle School), also in Orlando.

Edgewater and Boone were originally to be named North and South High Schools, respectively. However, William R. Boone, who was to be principal of South, died the summer before the schools opened. South High was renamed in his memory. North High was then named for the road it was built beside, Edgewater Drive.

Edgewater High School has recently been renovated into a three-story facility on the land which previously held mobile homes to the North of the old campus, most of which will be destroyed to create a new sports field. The remaining buildings will undergo a refurbishment to house freshmen and will be available by the start of the 2011-2012 school year. The new facility is mostly indoors to allow for overall protection from the elements and a more secure campus, and uses new technology such as new Promethean boards and an all new auditorium. Students were given access to the facility on the first day back to class in 2011 after winter break, and both staff and students are currently working on adjusting to the new facility.

Demographics
The demographic breakdown of the 2,034 students enrolled in 2016–17 was:

Gender

Male – 53.4%
Female – 46.6%

Race and Ethnicity

Black or African American – 49.5%
White – 26.9%
Hispanic and Latino – 18.6%
Two or More Races – 2.4%
Asian – 2.3%
American Indian and Alaska Native – 0.2%
Native Hawaiian and Other Pacific Islander – 0.1%

63.4% of the students were eligible for free or reduced price lunch. Edgewater High School is a Title I school.

Athletics
Edgewater High School has various varsity sports teams, including Baseball, Basketball, Bowling, Cheering, Cross Country, Flag Football, Football, Golf, Lacrosse, Rowing, Soccer, Softball, Swimming, Tennis, Track & Field, Volleyball, Water Polo, Weightlifting, and Wrestling

State Championships

Boys' Basketball - 1976, 2004
Girls' Basketball - 2007, 2012, 2013, 2014
Boys' Cross Country - 1994

Notable alumni
 Marquis Daniels, basketball player
Howie Dorough, singer-songwriter
 Mike Freeman, baseball player
Davis Gaines, actor
Karl Joseph, football player
 Sharon Lechter, author
Norm Lewis, actor
 Quincy McDuffie, football player
 Anfernee Simons, basketball player
 Sharon Vaughn, singer-songwriter
 Darius Washington Jr., basketball player
 Mike Sims-Walker, football player
Kristen Scott, soccer player

References

External links
 
 Orange County Public Schools official website

1952 establishments in Florida
Educational institutions established in 1952
High schools in Orange County, Florida
Orange County Public Schools
Public high schools in Florida
Schools in Orlando, Florida